Teboho Mokoena may refer to three South African soccer players:

Teboho Mokoena (soccer, born 1974)
Teboho Mokoena (soccer, born 1997)
Aaron Mokoena (born 1980)